Club Deportivo La Muela was a Spanish football team based in La Muela, in the autonomous community of Aragon. Founded in 2005 and dissolved in 2011, it held home games at Clemente Padilla, with a 1,500-seat capacity.

History
Founded in 2005, La Muela first reached the fourth division in 2008, promoting to the third level after only two seasons in the category after ranking second in its group.

In 2010–11 the club finished 17th in group II, being immediately relegated back. Furthermore, before the new season began, it was demoted two divisions, landing in Segunda Regional; shortly after however, it dissolved.

Season to season

1 season in Segunda División B
2 seasons in Tercera División

Famous players

References

External links
 Club Profile on BDFutbol

Association football clubs established in 2005
Association football clubs disestablished in 2011
Defunct football clubs in Aragon
2005 establishments in Spain
2011 disestablishments in Spain